The enzyme hydroxypyruvate decarboxylase catalyzes the chemical reaction

hydroxypyruvate  glycolaldehyde + CO2

This enzyme belongs to the family of lyases, specifically the carboxy-lyases, which cleave carbon-carbon bonds.  The systematic name of this enzyme class is hydroxypyruvate carboxy-lyase (glycolaldehyde-forming). This enzyme is also called hydroxypyruvate carboxy-lyase.  This enzyme participates in glyoxylate and dicarboxylate metabolism.

References

 

EC 4.1.1
Enzymes of unknown structure